A list of films produced in Egypt in 1907. For an A-Z list of films currently on Wikipedia, see :Category:Egyptian films.

1907

References

External links
 The Early Years of Documentaries and Short Films in Egypt at Bibliotheca Alexandria's Alex Cinema
 Egyptian films of 1907 at the Internet Movie Database
 Egyptian films of 1907 elCinema.com

Lists of Egyptian films by year
1907 in Egypt
Lists of 1907 films by country or language